François Delloye (16 December 1888 – 14 November 1958) was a Belgian athlete. He competed at the 1908 Summer Olympics in London. In the 1500 metres, Delloye placed fifth of seven in his initial semifinal heat and did not advance to the final. He also competed at the 1912 Summer Olympics in Stockholm.

References

Sources
 
 
 
 

1888 births
1958 deaths
Belgian male middle-distance runners
Athletes (track and field) at the 1908 Summer Olympics
Athletes (track and field) at the 1912 Summer Olympics
Olympic athletes of Belgium